"Then You Look at Me" is a song by Canadian singer Celine Dion, supposed to be released on 11 December 1999 as the second single from her first English-language compilation album, All the Way... A Decade of Song (1999). It is also the theme song to the 1999 film Bicentennial Man. The song was written by James Horner and Will Jennings, who wrote for Dion her 1997 hit "My Heart Will Go On", which was the theme for the film Titanic. A music video was also produced to promote the single.

Background and release
The Bicentennial Man film, released on 13 December 1999, and starring Robin Williams, became a flop and the single was cancelled. The second reason was that "That's the Way It Is" became a hit and was still strong on the singles charts around the world. However, "Then You Look at Me" was included as a B-side to the "Live (for the One I Love)", The First Time Ever I Saw Your Face" and "I Want You to Need Me" singles. The movie soundtrack also included the song but in a slightly modified version, produced by James Horner and Simon Franglen. The version from Dion's album was produced by David Foster, Horner and Franglen and differs in arrangements and in Dion's interpretation.

The "Then You Look at Me" music video, featuring Dion in a futuristic outfit and set in a robot research facility with clips of the film playing on screens in the background, was directed by Bille Woodruff and released at the end of 1999. It was included on Dion's All the Way... A Decade of Song & Video DVD in 2001.

Critical reception
AllMusic senior editor Stephen Thomas Erlewine said that "this song isn't bad, it just isn't particularly memorable", while comparing to Dion's hits. Michael Paoletta from Billboard highlighted it and called it characteristically "roof-raising, fan-stoking" Dion anthem. Geoff Edgers from Salon Magazine noted that the song "have that crashing Dion quality". Christopher Smith from TalkAboutPopMusic described "Then You Look at Me" as "dramatic".

Formats and track listings
 Chilean promotional CD single
"Then You Look at Me" (album version) – 4:08
"Then You Look at Me" (soundtrack version) – 4:20

References

External links
 

Celine Dion songs
1990s ballads
1999 singles
Music videos directed by Bille Woodruff
Songs with lyrics by Will Jennings
Songs written by James Horner
Songs written for films
Love themes
Pop ballads
Song recordings produced by David Foster
1999 songs
Columbia Records singles